Cay Forrester (born Mila Patricia Crosby; December 26, 1921 – June 18, 2005) was an American film and television actress. She appeared predominantly in minor films with some exceptions, such as Advise and Consent and the Susan Hayward hit Smash-Up, the Story of a Woman.

Biography
Forrester made her debut as "Kay Forrester" in a 1943 Western called Blazing Guns.   Her biggest role was in the 1950 cult classic DOA, where Forrester played a married woman who tempts Edmond O'Brien. Shortly after this film, she married producer Ludlow Flower Jr  and retired from the big screen.  

Forrester went on to write and co-star in the 1961 thriller Five Minutes to Live produced by her husband that was notable for the rare big-screen appearance of Johnny Cash. The film was re-released in 1966 under the title Door-to-Door Maniac.

Forrester was  guest-starring on television shows up to the early 1970s.  Her final films were two major disaster films with Charlton Heston, Two-Minute Warning and Airport 1975.

Forrester died of pneumonia in Las Vegas, Nevada, in 2005.

Filmography

References

External links

 
 Cay Forrester at the University of Wisconsin's Actors Studio audio collection

1921 births
2005 deaths
Actors Studio alumni
Deaths from pneumonia in Nevada